In college football, 2010 NCAA football bowl games may refer to:

2009–10 NCAA football bowl games, for games played in January 2010 as part of the 2009 season.
2010–11 NCAA football bowl games, for games played in December 2010 as part of the 2010 season.